Jbabra is a town in Taounate Province, Taza-Al Hoceima-Taounate, Morocco. According to the 2004 census it has a population of 19,076.

References

Populated places in Taounate Province
Rural communes of Fès-Meknès